Linum is a village of the municipality Fehrbellin in the Ostprignitz-Ruppin district of Brandenburg, Germany. It is sometimes called the "stork village" of Linum.

Notable locals 
Ernst Bahr, German politician and member of the Social Democratic Party of Germany; began his career as a teacher in Linum
Luise Hensel, religious author and poet
Frederick W. Horn, Wisconsin legislator, politician and lawyer

Villages in Brandenburg